Rock 'n' Roll Nightmare is a 1987 Canadian direct-to-video horror film directed by John Fasano, and stars heavy metal musician Jon Mikl Thor, Jillian Peri and Teresa Simpson.

Plot 
Hoping to record some new music, the band Triton travels to an isolated farmhouse in Ontario, Canada, unaware that it is inhabited by murderous demons. Along for the trip are some of the band members' significant others, John's girlfriend Randy, Roger's new wife Mary, and Stig's girlfriend Lou Anne. Although some are disappointed at the lack of a television and other distractions, the band quickly begins to record new songs. The demons are also busy, as they begin secretly murdering and possessing the group's souls one by one,  until only John is left.

Frustrated with the lack of success with claiming John's soul, Beelzebub appears in front of John, who reveals himself to be none other than the archangel known as the Intercessor. He also reveals that none of the other people at the house existed, as they were only shadows meant to trick Beelzebub into appearing. The two begin a fight to the death, which the Intercessor wins. As the movie comes to a close, it shows a suburban home in a seemingly normal neighborhood as foreboding music begins to play, implying that home is also demon ridden.

Cast 

 Jon Mikl Thor as John Triton
 Jillian Peri as Lou Anne
 Frank Dietz as Roger Eburt 
 David Lane as Max 
 Teresa Simpson as Randy 
 Fried Adam Fried as Phil 
 Denise Dicandia as  Dee Dee
 Jim Cirile as Stig
 Liane Abel Dietz as Mary Eburt

Production 
Rock 'n' Roll Nightmare was developed under the working titles of The Edge of Hell and The Arch Angel. It was shot in Toronto.

Release
The film was distributed in the United States by the Shapiro Entertainment Corporation. The film was released on DVD by Synapse films.

Soundtrack 
The film's soundtrack was released to CD in 2006. Thom Jurek of AllMusic gave it a favorable review, writing that "if you are looking for one of the most outrageously bad exploitation/horror movie soundtracks, get your hands on this one pronto."

Reception 
In the years following its release the movie has received positive reviews over its campy nature, which multiple reviewers feel gives unintentional entertainment. Not Coming to a Theater Near You commented that the movie was "a cheap, incompetently rendered film, but it is not a deceptive one". Antagony & Ecstasy shared similar opinions, writing: "The movie has absolutely everything you could possibly want from high-spirited trash: a menagerie of uniformly dodgy foam monsters, an especially dodgy foam Beelzebub in the climax, clumsy dialogue, bizarrely flat performances, an ending that straight-up makes no sense, fantastically misplaced ambition, and a scene where a blond with too much mascara and huge tits parades around in a shower."

Sequel 

In 2005 a sequel Intercessor: Another Rock 'N' Roll Nightmare featuring Jon Mikl Thor was made.

References

External links 
 
 

American direct-to-video films
1987 horror films
1987 films
Films shot in Toronto
American rock music films
American supernatural horror films
The Devil in film
Heavy metal films
1980s English-language films
Films directed by John Fasano
1980s American films